Vigia or Vigía may refer to:

Places
 Vigia (mountain), a mountain on the island of Boa Vista, Cape Verde
 Vigia, Pará, a municipality in the State of Pará, Brazil
 Vigía del Fuerte, a town in Colombia
 Finca Vigía, the house of Ernest Hemingway near Havana, Cuba
 Cruceta del Vigía, a hilltop cross in Ponce, Puerto Rico
 El Vigía, the shire town of Alberto Adriani Municipality, Venezuela
 Cerro del Vigía, a historically important hill in the northern section of the city of Ponce, Puerto Rico.

Other 
 Atlético El Vigía, an association football club based in El Vigía
 Vigia, a synonym of the plant genus Plukenetia
 Vigia (nautical), a warning on a navigational chart indicating a possible hazard of unknown exact location